Time is the 16th studio album by British-American rock band Fleetwood Mac, released on 10 October 1995. This album features a unique line-up for the band, featuring the addition of country vocalist Bekka Bramlett (daughter of Delaney and Bonnie) and former Traffic guitarist Dave Mason. It was the second album released after the departure of Lindsey Buckingham in 1987 (although he makes an appearance as a backing vocalist on one track), and the only Fleetwood Mac album since 1974's Heroes Are Hard to Find to not feature any contribution from Stevie Nicks. Additionally, it is the final Fleetwood Mac studio album to feature Christine McVie as an official member.

The album received unfavorable reviews from critics and was a commercial disappointment, failing to chart in the US and peaking at number 47 in the UK.

Background
Fleetwood mentioned in his autobiography that Christine McVie did not originally intend to participate on the album, but Warner Bros. had insisted she appear. As such, her five featured songs were recorded separately from the full band and all guitar parts on these were played by session musician Michael Thompson, although Billy Burnette is featured on the album's only single, "I Do", which only charted in Canada. "Hollywood" alludes to the homesickness that would cause her to retire temporarily from the band, while "Nights in Estoril" celebrated time spent at Estoril in Portugal with her then-husband Eddy Quintela, who was Portuguese himself.

Within a year this band line-up had split, with Mason, Bramlett and Billy Burnette all leaving the band. Christine McVie, who had already retired from live performances, informed the band that it would also be her last album appearance. Bramlett and Burnette recorded the Bekka & Billy album together in 1997, the same year Lindsey Buckingham and Stevie Nicks rejoined Fleetwood Mac.

The band did not tour following the album's release in October 1995, but had (without Christine McVie) toured from July to December 1994, and again from April to September 1995. Jeremy Spencer, one of the band's original guitarists, joined the group on stage for their Tokyo performance. The only songs from Time to be performed at these shows were "Blow by Blow" and "Dreamin' the Dream". "All Over Again" received its first live performances on the An Evening with Fleetwood Mac tour in 2018 as a live duet between Christine McVie and Stevie Nicks, with new guitarist Neil Finn playing keyboards.

Songs

Another version of "Blow by Blow" had featured on the album for the 1994 World Cup the previous year. The five-piece lineup fronted by Billy Burnette, Mason and Bramlett performed it at the tournament's launch concert along with "Dreamin' the Dream", "The Chain" and "Oh Well".

"Nothing Without You" had originally been recorded by Delaney Bramlett, the father of Bekka, on his 1975 album Giving Birth to a Song which had featured writing contributions from Billy Burnette. An additional verse written by Bekka ensured she got a writing credit. Aside from this her only writing contribution was "Dreamin' the Dream".

The album also featured a rare lead vocal from drummer/band leader Mick Fleetwood on the seven-minute spoken piece "These Strange Times", produced by Duran Duran producer John Jones and written with Beach Boys co-writer Ray Kennedy. The spoken-word piece paid tribute to Peter Green and openly alluded to his songs "Man of the World" and "The Green Manalishi". The third verse also alluded to Stevie Nicks' "Dreams" and Lindsey Buckingham's "Walk a Thin Line". Fleetwood's only previous vocal/lyrical contribution to the group had been another spoken piece, "Lizard People" (from the "In the Back of My Mind" single).

Critical reception
The album received negative reviews. AllMusic gave the album a two star review, considering it to be a drop in quality from their previous efforts. It was voted number 10 in the All-Time Worst Albums Ever Made from Colin Larkin's All Time Top 1000 Albums.

Track listing

Personnel 
Fleetwood Mac
 Christine McVie – keyboards, vocals
 Dave Mason – guitars, vocals
 Billy Burnette – guitars, vocals
 John McVie – bass guitar
 Mick Fleetwood – drums, percussion, guitars and vocals (13)
 Bekka Bramlett – vocals

Additional musicians
 Scott Pinkerton – synthesizer programming 
 Steve Thoma – keyboards (3, 4, 9)
 John Jones – keyboards, guitars, bass (13)
 Michael Thompson – guitars (2, 5, 8, 10, 12)
 Fred Tackett – trumpet (8)
 Lindsey Buckingham – backing vocals (6)
 Lucy Fleetwood – backing vocals (13)

Production
 Fleetwood Mac – producers (1, 3, 4, 6, 7, 9, 11)
 Richard Dashut – producer (1, 2, 4–12)
 Christine McVie – producer (2, 5, 8, 10, 12)
 Dave Mason – producer (3)
 Billy Burnette – producer (7)
 John Jones – producer (13), recording (13), mixing (13)
 Ray Kennedy – producer (13)
 Ken Allardyce – recording (1–13), mixing (1–13)
 Charlie Brocco – additional engineer (1–12)
 Alan Sanderson – additional engineer (1–12), assistant engineer (1–12)
 Allen Sides – additional engineer (1–12)
 Jimmy Hotz – additional engineer (13)
 David Eike – assistant engineer (1–12)
 Richard Huredia – assistant engineer (1–12)
 Tom Nellen – assistant engineer (1–12)
 Dave Shiffman – assistant engineer (1–12)
 Stephen Marcussen – mastering
 Don Tyler – mastering assistant 
 Scott Pinkerton – production assistant 
 John Courage – production coordinator 
 Mick Fleetwood – cover concept
 Gabrielle Raumberger – art direction 
 Frank Chi – design 
 Lance Staedler – band photography 
 Dale McRaven – cover photography 
 Bonnie Nelson – cover photography 

Studios
 Recorded and Mixed at Ocean Way Recording (Hollywood, California).
 Additional recording at Sunset Sound Recorders (Hollywood, California).
 Mastered at Precision Mastering (Hollywood, California).

Charts

References

External links

Fleetwood Mac albums
1995 albums
Albums produced by Richard Dashut
Warner Records albums
Albums recorded at Sunset Sound Recorders
Albums recorded at United Western Recorders
Albums produced by John McVie
Albums produced by Mick Fleetwood
Albums produced by Christine McVie
Albums produced by Dave Mason